Eleanore Deirdre O'Connell (16 June 1939 – 9 June 2001) was an Irish American actress, singer, and theatre director who founded the Focus Theatre in Dublin, Ireland.

Biography
O'Connell was born in the South Bronx district of New York City, one of five children whose parents were Irish immigrants.  When she finished school, she pursued her interest in theatre studying first at Erwin Piscator's Dramatic Workshop, New York City, and later at the Actors Studio run by Lee Strasberg.  In her early twenties, O'Connell moved to Dublin, Ireland, where she set up the Stanislavski Studio at the Pocket Theatre. There she trained a small company of actors in Stanislavski's system.  In 1967, she founded the Focus Theatre, becoming its manager, artistic director, and fundraiser—as well as acting in many of its productions.

She was a noted folk-singer and performed at the Newport Folk Festival.  She married the Irish singer Luke Kelly in June 1965, but they separated in the early 1970s.

O'Connell died of cancer at her home in Dublin at the age of 61 and is buried in Glasnevin Cemetery.

Further reading
 O'Connell Cusack, Geraldine, Children of the Far-flung, The Liffey Press (Oct 2003), 
 Exit, stage left (obituary)

References

External links
Deirdre O'Connell at Irish Playography

1939 births
2001 deaths
Burials at Glasnevin Cemetery
Irish folk singers
Irish stage actresses
Irish theatre directors
Irish theatre managers and producers
People from the Bronx
Deaths from cancer in the Republic of Ireland
20th-century Irish women singers